John Patterson may refer to:

Military
John Patterson (Medal of Honor) (1838–1922), Medal of Honor recipient
John Henry Patterson (Medal of Honor) (1843–1920), Medal of Honor recipient
John Henry Patterson (author) (1867–1947), Anglo-Irish soldier and writer

Politics
John Patterson (Ohio congressman) (1771–1848), U.S. congressman from Ohio
John Patterson (Ohio state representative) (born 1956)
John J. Patterson (1830–1912), U.S. senator from South Carolina, 1873–1879
John M. Patterson (1921–2021), U.S. politician from Alabama
John Paterson (New York politician) (often spelled Patterson, 1744–1808), New York congressman
John Patterson (Southern Maori politician) (1821–1899), New Zealand Māori member of Parliament
John Patterson (Auckland politician) (1855–1923), Auckland city councillor, 1900–1903 and 1908–1911

Sports
John W. Patterson (1872–1940), nicknamed Pat, African American baseball player and team manager 1893–1907
John Patterson (infielder) (born 1967), former Major League infielder
John Patterson (pitcher) (born 1978), former Major League pitcher
John Patterson (cricketer) (1860–1943), English cricketer
Red Patterson (John William Patterson, born 1987), former Major League pitcher

Other
John Henry Patterson (NCR owner) (1844–1922), founder of the National Cash Register Company
John Patterson (meteorologist) (1872–1956), director of the Canadian Meteorological Service
John Thomas Patterson (geneticist) (1878–1960), American geneticist and professor
John H. Patterson (economist) (1905–?), American economist
John Patterson (actor) (fl. 1930s), actor in the 1937 film Hotel Haywire
John Patterson (diplomat) (died 1974), US diplomat murdered in Mexico
John Patterson (director) (1940–2005), American film and television director
John Richard Patterson (1945–1997), founder of the Dateline computer-dating company
John Patterson (screenwriter) (1949-2016), Australian screenwriter, lyricist, playwright and children's author
USCGC John Patterson (WPC-1153), the 53rd Sentinel-class cutter
John Patterson (USCG), namesake of a Sentinel-class cutter

See also
John Paterson (disambiguation)
John Henry Patterson (disambiguation)
Jack Patterson (disambiguation)